Women of Reform Judaism (WRJ), formerly known as the National Federation of Temple Sisterhoods, is the women's affiliate of the Union for Reform Judaism. As the primary women's organization in the Reform Jewish movement, WRJ represents over 65,000 women. WRJ advocates for social justice, raises funds for charities and rabbinic scholarships, and educates congregational leaders.

Notable contributions
In 1972, the National Federation of Temple Sisterhoods was instrumental in the ordination of the first American female rabbi, Sally Priesand. In 1963 the National Federation of Temple Sisterhoods had approved a resolution at its biennial assembly calling on the Union of American Hebrew Congregations (now the Union for Reform Judaism), the Central Conference of American Rabbis, and the Hebrew Union College-Jewish Institute of Religion to move forward on the ordination of women.

The YES Fund (Youth, Education, and Special Projects), maintained by WRJ, provides support to North American Federation of Temple Youth, the Hebrew Union College, the Religious Action Center of Reform Judaism, and many other organizations and charities. WRJ also supports Abraham Geiger College, the first seminary to ordain a Rabbi in Germany since World War II.

The Torah: A Women's Commentary recently won the Everett Family Foundation Jewish Book of the Year award. This counterpart to The Torah: A Modern Commentary gives a new perspective on women in the Torah. A Women's Commentary is a scholarly work, written by Jewish women, that gives voices to the women in the Torah and gives a woman's perspective on these classical stories. The book began as a WRJ project in 1992 and was published in 2008 with URJ Press.

Leadership and structure
For its first twenty years (1913-1933), Women of Reform Judaism was led by volunteer presidents, the first being Carrie Simon. Jane Evans became its first full-time Executive Director in 1933, a position she held until 1976. Another president was Stella Heinsheimer Freiberg. 

As of March 2018, the President of WRJ is Susan C. Bass, of Congregation Beth Israel, Houston, TX. She previously served as WRJ Vice President and WRJ Southeast District president. 

Her First Vice President is Sara B. Charney (Holy Blossom Temple, Toronto, ONT). She is also assisted by vice presidents Abigail Fisher (Beth El Temple Center, Belmont, MA), Madi Hoesten (Congregation Kol Tikvah, Parkland, Fl), Jane Taves (Temple Beth El, Madison, WI), and Julia C. Weinstein (University Synagogue, Los Angeles, CA). The Treasurer is Lisa D. Singer (Temple Beth Shalom, Hudson, OH), and the Secretary is Nicole Villalpando (Congregation Beth Israel, Austin, TX).

The Executive Director is Rabbi Marla J. Feldman (Central Syngagogue, New York, NY), and there is an executive committee to assist the Officers and Board of Directors.

Prior to 2018, the President had been Blair C. Marks (Temple Kol Emeth, Marietta, GA).

There are eight districts that span the United States and Canada, each of which has a district president.

Notes and references

External links
Women of Reform Judaism

Union for Reform Judaism
Women's political advocacy groups in the United States
Reform Judaism and women